Candice  (born 19 April 1979) is a field hockey forward from South Africa, who did not make it into the national squad that finished 9th at the 2004 Summer Olympics in Athens. The striker made her international debut in 2003.  comes from Pretoria, and is nicknamed Cands. She plays for a provincial team called Northern Gauteng. She announced her retirement from international hockey on 12 March 2007.

Education
 attended Stirling Primary and Clarendon High School for Girls. She studied marketing at Natal Technikon, and went on to the University of Pretoria.

Personal
Candice's mother, Beverly, played six times for the South Africa hockey team. Her sister, Danielle, was a member of the South African Junior World Cup team in 2005, and a member of the Under-18 team in 2005, and captain of it in 2006.

International Senior tournaments
 2002 – Champions Challenge, Johannesburg (4th)
 2005 – Champions Challenge, Virginia Beach (2nd)

References

External links

1979 births
Living people
Sportspeople from Pretoria
South African female field hockey players
University of Pretoria alumni
Durban University of Technology alumni
Alumni of Clarendon High School for Girls